School District 60 Peace River North is a school district in northeastern British Columbia adjacent to the Alberta border. Its board office is in Fort St. John which is also where the majority of the schools are located. It also serves the outlying communities of Taylor, Prespatou, Hudson's Hope, Buick Creek and Wonowon.

History
School District 60 was the first district in British Columbia to institute a laptop computer program on a large scale (grade 6 and 7). Currently the program provides an iPad to each student in grade 6. SD60 is well known for partnerships with community, industry, post-secondary, neighbouring districts, and businesses.

Schools

See also
List of school districts in British Columbia

Fort St. John, British Columbia
Peace River Country
60